Super Why! (stylized as Super WHY!) is a CGI-animated superhero preschool television series created by Angela C. Santomero (who also created Blue's Clues) for PBS Kids and aimed for preschoolers ages 3 to 6. The series, produced by New York City-based Out of the Blue Enterprises in association with Toronto-based C.O.R.E. Toons (animation for season 1 only, being the company's final show produced before their closure on March 15, 2010), Gallus Entertainment (animation for season 2 only) and DHX Media (originally through its Decode Entertainment division for seasons one and two), was distributed by PBS in the United States, Decode Enterprises for seasons 1 and 2 and DHX Distribution for season 3.

Originally created as a stop motion pilot in 1999 by Cuppa Coffee Animation that was pitched to Nickelodeon/Nick Jr. but later shown at the 2000 Annecy Film Festival, the show was eventually picked up by PBS Kids, changing the animation to CGI. The show debuted on September 3, 2007 and ended on May 12, 2016 after nearly a decade with a total of 103 episodes across three seasons.

Plot
The show is set in Storybrook Village, where the titular character, Whyatt Beanstalk, lives with his friends Woofster (first appearing in season 2), Littlest Pig, Red Riding Hood, and Princess Pea. In each of the episodes, one of the main characters (sometimes two characters, or even all five) has a "super big problem", a "super big question", or a "super big mystery". The main characters then discuss their situation at the Book Club, agreeing to look and fly in a book of a famous story to resolve it.

The goal of the Super Readers is to follow the storyline of the book. As they progress through the events of the story, they encounter various obstacles, which can be solved by applying their literacy skills to change the story. As they overcome each of these obstacles, they are rewarded with red glittery "Super Letters" that form the solution to whatever scenario they're investigating.

At the conclusion of the adventure, the Super Readers fly back to the Book Club. The Super Letters are put onto the giant computer screen and are spelled out to show the "Super Story Answer". Then, one of the Super Readers gives the reason why that particular word or phrase serves as the solution to their issue or mystery.

Episodes

Characters
 Whyatt Beanstalk/Super Why (voiced by Nicholas Castel Vanderburgh in season 1, Nicholas Kaegi in season 2, and Johnny Orlando in season 3) is the host of the series and the leader of the group of characters who become the "Super Readers." Whyatt is an olive-skinned, blue-eyed, brunet boy who wears a dark blue polo shirt with green stripes, khaki pants, and brown shoes. In the episode "Jack and the Beanstalk", it is revealed that Whyatt's older brother, Jack is the protagonist of the English folktale of the same name. Whyatt lives with his mother Mrs. Beanstalk (voiced by Sarah Ann Kennedy), who writes stories, and his father Mr. Beanstalk who illustrates them, along with his baby sister, Joy. Jack appears in some episodes but is generally "away at college." When Whyatt arrives at the book club, he introduces himself, saying "Whyatt here!" His super reader form is Super Why. In this form, he has a green mask, pair of blue gray and gray turbo sneakers, a blue cape, gold belt around his waist, green jumpsuit, and a blue undergarment. His symbols are a blue book and a question mark and his signature colors are green and blue. He has "the power to read", which focuses on vocabulary.
 Littlest Pig/Alpha Pig (voiced by Zachary Bloch in seasons 1-2 and Samuel Faraci in season 3) is referred to in the credits as "The Littlest Pig," he introduces himself at the book club as "P is for Pig!" but throughout the show, he is simply known as "Pig". Pig enjoys pretending and dressing up like his father, a construction pig. He is pink and generally wears a hard hat, with a toolkit belt and safety goggles. His super reader form is Alpha Pig. In this form, he wears a blue-violet short sleeved outfit with orange accents, an orange belt with a triangle on the center, an orange hard hat with a purple triangle on the center, safety goggles, yellow cape and orange sneakers with yellow and brown accents. His toolbox has various equipment in it. His symbol is a triangle and his signature colors are blue-violet and orange. He has "alphabet power", which focuses on the alphabet.
 Little Red Riding Hood/Wonder Red (voiced by Siera Florindo in seasons 1-2 and T.J. McGibbon in season 3) is referred to as "Red" in the TV series. The title character from the fairy tale, she only refers to herself as "Red Riding Hood". She is a freckle-faced pale-skinned brunette/redhead who wears a red hooded long-sleeved outfit and skirt and red roller skates as well as a red flat cap. When she is introduced, she says "Red Riding Hood rolling in!" When turned into her super reader form, Wonder Red, her attire becomes a purple leotard with red trim that shows her midriff. Her skates are turned purple and her main item is the Wonder Words Basket and her symbol is a spiral and her signature colors are red and purple. She has "word power", which focuses on rhyming and word families like "OP", "AT", "UN", "UMP", "OG", etc. In the episode "Judith's Happy Chanukah", it is revealed that Red is Jewish, as she invites Whyatt over to her Grandma's house for Hanukkah.
 Princess Pea/Princess Presto (voiced by Tajja Isen) was named after the children's story "The Princess and the Pea"; it is shown in the episode The Princess and The Pea that the princess in that story was Pea's mother and the prince in that story was her father. However, in this case, "Pea" is her surname. She has dark skin with large green eyes and curly black hair, wears a lilac princess dress and a tiara. She loves to dance. When she enters, she says, "Princess Pea at your service!" Her super reader form is Princess Presto and in this form, she pulls her long hair into a bun, and she wears a sleeveless pink dress with green accents and a purple star in the middle, pink tiara, pink evening gloves with green accents, pink sparkly silk cape, and pink ballet flats. Her symbol is a star, which matches her Magic Spelling Wand and her signature colors are pink and green. She has "spelling power", which focuses on spelling.
 Woofster (voiced by Joanne Vannicola) is a puppy dog with light brown spots. He also lives with Whyatt and his family. When he turns into his super reader form, he has dictionary power and can find the meaning to any word. His Super Reader form has a blue cape and a collar with a small red dictionary, and allows him the power to talk like persons also and his symbol is a dog bone and his signature colors are blue and red. He is also declared the fifth Super Reader. He debuted in the Season 2 premiere "Woofster Finds a Home" and officially became a member of the Super Readers in the same episode. He cuts the "Super You" part after Whyatt's transformation in the series' second and third season.

Reception

Super Why! was received very positively on Common Sense Media, where reviewer Emily Ashby rates the show 4/5 in the categories positive messages, positive role models, and educational value. Ashby's review additionally states while extremely mild sequences of suspense and peril do occur and how the show partnered with Post Consumer Brands for a branded cereal, there are very low amounts of violence/scariness and consumerism, as well as no "sexy stuff", profanity, or drinking, drugs, and smoking at all. Ashby additionally credits the merit of the show to its usage of classic children's fairy tales and the usage of characters from them, specifically the Three Little Pigs.

Susan Stewart, a reviewer for The New York Times, criticized the show for taking classic fairy tales with traditionally dark lessons, specifically the Three Little Pigs and Hansel and Gretel, and morph them into etiquette lessons. Stewart also criticized the use of interactive questions for viewers to answer and their length, specifically questions like "what comes after the letter E?". Despite its flaws, Stewart does state that the show is brilliant in educational value.

Promotions and other media

Live show
In 2012, a live show was launched across the United States, titled Super WHY Live: You've Got the Power. Produced by SB2N entertainment, Super WHY Live was promoted for having aerial stunts and "cutting-edge technology", and due to its high levels of audience engagement, was jokingly referred to by Santomero as “‘the Rocky Horror Picture Show’ for preschoolers”. The show, which follows Super Why, Alpha Pig, Wonder Red, Princess Presto, and Woofster, premiered in Monroe, Louisiana and toured into spring 2013, where the tour concluded in Albany, New York on May 10.

The live show's soundtrack was produced by Jack Antonoff, who consulted his preschool daughter for her reaction to the series and how to compose for it. Antonoff noted that being natively skilled in indie rock, writing for the show was not very different, though the lyrics needed to be much less open to interpretation and easy to understand when composing for a young audience.

References

External links
 Official website
 

2000s American animated television series
2000s Canadian animated television series
2010s American animated television series
2010s Canadian animated television series
2007 American television series debuts
2007 Canadian television series debuts
2016 American television series endings
2016 Canadian television series endings
American children's animated superhero television series
American computer-animated television series
American preschool education television series
American television series with live action and animation
Canadian children's animated superhero television series
Canadian computer-animated television series
Canadian preschool education television series
Canadian television series with live action and animation
Animated preschool education television series
2000s preschool education television series
2010s preschool education television series
English-language television shows
CBC Television original programming
Family Jr. original programming
PBS Kids shows
PBS original programming
Reading and literacy television series
Animated television series about children
Crossover animated television series
Television series by DHX Media
Television series by 9 Story Media Group
Television series created by Angela Santomero
Television shows based on fairy tales